Perry Johnson is an American businessman and author from Michigan. He has written several books on international quality control standards and certification. He is a member of the Republican Party, campaigning in the 2022 Michigan gubernatorial election for the Republican nomination for governor of Michigan, but was disqualified from the primary ballot, failing to meet the 15,000 signature minimum.

In 2023, he launched his bid for the 2024 Republican nomination for President of the United States.

Early life and education 
Perry Johnson was born to Dorothy and Carl Johnson in January 23, 1948, in Dolton, Illinois. He has a younger sister, Valerie, born in 1949.

Education 

At the age of 14, Johnson started attending Thornridge High School. Johnson holds a degree in mathematics from the University of Illinois Urbana-Champaign, with a minor in economics, and completed coursework in the graduate program for psychology at the University of Detroit.

Johnson later was employed as a psychologist before leaving for employment at General Motors.

Later life 
In 2008, he married Diana Johnson. He resides in Bloomfield Hills, Michigan and is married with three sons.

Work 
Johnson has a background in the area of quality and has published several works related to the subject, including "ISO 9000: Meeting the International Standards". Johnson serves as president of Perry Johnson International Holdings.

Johnson is also the author of "Two Cents To Save America," a political work discussing fiscal and sociological issues from a right-wing perspective.

ISO Standards 
Johnson is a speaker and author on numerous ISO standards, including the ISO 9000 Series, the ISO 14000 Series, and the AS9100 standard for aerospace. He authored the textbook ISO 9000: Meeting the New International Standards, followed by its second and third edition, with the latest being published in 2000. As well as authoring multiple ISO Series textbooks, he also wrote Keeping Score: Strategies and Tactics for Winning the Quality War, which was first published in 1989. Perry also authored various other textbooks, including

 ISO 14000 Road Map to Registration
 ISO 14000: The Business Manager’s Complete Guide to Environmental Management
 ISO/QS-9000 Yearbook: 1998

ISO 9000 and QS9000 
In 1983, Johnson founded Perry Johnson, Inc. which presented seminars on quality standards, and since its inception, the ISO 9000 standards. After General Motors, Chrysler, and Ford Motor Company—the "Big Three," switched to QS9000, requiring all suppliers to receive QS9000 certification, the Johnson firm, which supplied QS9000 certifications, quickly developed as one of the earliest Detroit firms.

The development of QS9000 standards helped prevent against the "Japanese invasion," i.e. the production of highly efficient and cheap cars which arose from the ubiquitous, rigid quality standards in Japan, said Carla Bailo, CEO of the Center of Automotive Research.

Conflict of Interest Controversy 
In 2003, Boeing filed a complaint against Perry Johnson, Inc. on the basis of two violations of conflict of interest rules in a period of 6 months. This prompted the U.S. Registrar Accreditation Board to suspend Johnson's accreditation firm from issuing aerospace certifications because the firm had taught suppliers how to pass the firm's own certification tests.

Politics

2022 Michigan gubernatorial campaign

In 2021 Johnson announced his candidacy for the Republican nomination for the governor of Michigan. He launched his campaign for governor in January 2021 with a $1.5 million advertising campaign that was featured during the 2021 Super Bowl.

Johnson did not meet the requirement of 15,000 valid signatures necessary to appear on the ballot.  Johnson filed a suit in federal court to halt the ballot printing so he could argue why he should be included on the ballot, but Johnson and two other candidates, Michael Markey and James Craig, had their appeals to remain on the ballot rejected by the state Supreme Court due to fraudulent signatures being used by paid circulators without the candidates' knowledge.

Before announcing his run for President, Johnson expressed interest in running for Michigan's open U.S. Senate seat in 2024.

2024 presidential candidate
Johnson has also hinted at a possible campaign for the presidency. He has filed paperwork with the Federal Election Commission to form a committee for his presidential campaign.Johnson ran a Super Bowl commercial in Iowa for his campaign.

At the 2023 Conservative Political Action Conference, Johnson received five percent of the presidential straw poll vote, coming in third place behind Donald Trump and Ron DeSantis.

References

External links 

American businesspeople
21st-century American politicians
Living people
Candidates in the 2024 United States presidential election
Year of birth missing (living people)